The 1991 Cleveland Browns season was the team's 42nd season with the National Football League. On August 5, Browns founder Paul Brown died at the age of 82.

1991 was the first of five seasons in Cleveland for head coach Bill Belichick. Under Belichick, the Browns managed a 6–10 record, while finishing in third place in the AFC Central.

Offseason

NFL draft

Trades Made 
 Traded Bob Buczkowski to Seattle Seahawks for 9x16

Personnel

Staff

Roster

Regular season

Schedule

Standings

Season summary

Week 17 at Steelers

References

External links 
 1991 Cleveland Browns at Pro Football Reference (Profootballreference.com)
 1991 Cleveland Browns Statistics at jt-sw.com
 1991 Cleveland Browns Schedule at jt-sw.com
 1991 Cleveland Browns at DatabaseFootball.com  

Cleveland
Cleveland Browns seasons
Cleveland